"Close to the Edge" is a song by the English progressive rock band Yes, featured on their fifth studio album Close to the Edge (1972). The song is over 18 minutes in length and takes up the entire first side of the album. It consists of four movements.

Movements

I. The Solid Time of Change
The song fades in with the sounds of running water, wind chimes, and birds chirping; a layering of sounds derived primarily from "environmental tapes" collected by lead vocalist Jon Anderson. These nature sounds move through a crescendo and into a somewhat menacing guitar melody, which is composed of a cacophonous musical passage that features a two-note guitar line which rapidly passes down and then up four octaves, in  time. The bass ascends through a line based on the notes of the second mode of the D harmonic minor scale (also called Locrian natural 6), adding an exotic flavor to the already cacophonic texture. The guitar melody is punctuated by a series of sudden band-harmonized vocables. Again, a crescendo signals a change, this time into a more traditional and less cacophonous melody. Like a classical composition, this melodic passage is the establishment of a theme that will go through many variations throughout the piece.

The lyrics are introduced at 4:00, along with a chorus that repeats throughout the song. Like the previously established melody, this chorus will be developed in many different ways, which will include changes to the lyrical content, as well as changes in time and key signatures, tempo, and harmony:

II. Total Mass Retain

The song continues with generally the same melody and style, though the bass part changes significantly. The chorus here changes to a faster pace, and then slows down again at the end of the section. The final words "I get up, I get down" introduce the next segment.

This section, along with a sped-up version of the introduction of birds chirping at the beginning and a small part of the beginning of "I Get Up I Get Down" at the end, was remixed as a 3:21 single prior to the release of the album. It was included as a bonus track on the remastered version of "Close to the Edge".

This is the shortest of the four sections of "Close to the Edge".

III. I Get Up I Get Down
The song significantly slows its tempo and lowers its volume. This segment consists of two sets of vocals: the main vocals, sung by Anderson which contain most of the lyrics, and the backing vocals, sung by Chris Squire and Steve Howe. At about 12 minutes into the song, Rick Wakeman, recorded on the pipe organ of London's St Giles-without-Cripplegate church, begins the main theme of this segment, which changes from a major to a minor key as the music progresses. Jon Anderson explained:

IV. Seasons of Man
The original, fast-paced theme picks up followed by musical and lyrical structure which sounds similar to "The Solid Time of Change", except this time with exclusively major chords. Rick Wakeman's organ parts are particularly complex and an overall polytonal effect is created with the guitar part being in a different key than the keyboard. The chorus is sung one last time before the vocals build up to the climax of the song in which all three themes from the prior movements ("A seasoned witch...", "close to the edge, down by the river", "Seasons will pass you by, I get up I get down") are presented. Afterwards, the final lyrics "I get up, I get down" are repeated as the song fades away into the "sounds of nature" in which it began.

Music

In his 2021 memoir, All My Yesterdays, guitarist and co-writer Steve Howe writes that the intro was an attempt to emulate the sound of jazz guitarist John McLaughlin's Mahavishnu Orchestra, a favorite of the band's. He and Wakeman created the background drone in the "I Get Up I Get Down". Wakeman's organ part was based on a bossa nova guitar part Howe had written for another song, and Wakeman added some Minimoog lines. Another part was from a song Howe had written when part of Bodast several years earlier.

Howe says that Anderson, to his regret, found he was unable to consistently sing the closing verse and chorus at the note he had hit in the studio when performing it live, so the band often performed that part in E flat instead of F. "This, to my ear, is rather unsatisfactory", he complained. He noted that even Jon Davison, who has sung lead vocals for Yes since 2012, prefers to sing it lower even though in Howe's opinion he has the range to reach that note.

Lyrics

In a 1996 interview, Anderson mentions that the song—indeed, the whole album—is inspired by the Hindu/Buddhist mysticism of Hermann Hesse's 1922 book Siddhartha.  "[We] did one album called Close to the Edge. [It] was based on the Siddhartha... You always come back down to the river.  [You] know, all the rivers come to the same ocean.  That was the basic idea.  And so we made a really beautiful album."

Anderson was concerned about how the words sounded, sometimes more than what they meant, creating, thus, lyrics that often don't seem to mean anything, such as "The time between the notes relates the colour to the scenes".

Cover versions
Japanese acid rock conglomerate Ruinzhatova included the song on their 2003 album Close to the RH. Running at a length of 17:54, it is a faithful note for note version but it is not one of the many recreations by tribute bands since a second guitarist replaces the main Wakeman keyboard parts and there is "a somewhat silly-sounding vocal interpretation" throughout.

A radically altered interpretation by British band Nick Awde & Desert Hearts appears on their 2010 EP Close to the Edge B/W Rocket Man/Meryl Streep, which features no drums or guitar, and substitutes the Hammond solo opening the "Seasons of Man" section with baritone saxophone by Wizzard horn player Nick Pentelow.

Personnel 
Jon Anderson – lead vocals
Steve Howe – electric guitars, electric sitar, backing vocals
Chris Squire – bass guitar, backing vocals
Rick Wakeman – Hammond organ, Minimoog, Mellotron, grand piano, RMI 368 Electra-Piano and Harpsichord, pipe organ
Bill Bruford – drums, percussion

References

Sources

External links
Religious interpretation
Notes From the Edge fanzine, issue #0159.

1972 songs
Yes (band) songs
Song recordings produced by Eddy Offord
Songs written by Jon Anderson
Songs written by Steve Howe (musician)